The Rems is a right tributary of the Neckar in eastern Baden-Württemberg. It is 78 km long. It upsprings at Essingen, near Aalen. It flows more or less west through the towns Böbingen an der Rems, Schwäbisch Gmünd, Lorch, Plüderhausen, Schorndorf, Remshalden and Waiblingen. At Remseck the Rems flows into the Neckar.

References

Rivers of Baden-Württemberg
Rivers of Germany